Greet may refer to:

 greeting, an act of communication
 Greet, Birmingham, West Midlands, England
 Greet (communication), a way for human beings to intentionally communicate awareness of each other's presence
 GREET Model 
 River Greet, a river in Nottinghamshire 
 In Scottish English, to greet is to cry

People with the given name Greet, a Dutch short form of Margaretha (Margaret):
 Greet Galliard (born 1926), Dutch swimmer
 Greet Grottendieck (born 1943), Dutch sculptor
 Greet Hellemans (born 1959), Dutch rower
 Greet Hofmans (1894–1968), Dutch faith healer
 Greet van Norden (1911–1963), Dutch swimmer

People with the surname Greet:
 Ben Greet (1857–1936), Shakespearean actor, director, and impresario
 Christopher Greet (21st century), Sri Lankan radio personality
 Clare Greet (1871–1939), English film actress
 William Greet (1851–1914), British theatre manager
 W. Cabell Greet (1901–1972), American philologist and professor of English

Dutch feminine given names
Given names derived from gemstones